Hans-Joachim Burba (born 15 August 1957) is a former German curler.

He is a former World men's runner-up, European men's curling champion and German men's curling champion (1992; bronze in 2015).

His brother Wolfgang Burba is a former curler and curling coach, he was Hans-Joachim's longtime teammate.

Teams

References

External links
 
 

1957 births
Living people
German male curlers
European curling champions
German curling champions